Mixed oxides of nitrogen (MON) are solutions of nitric oxide (NO) in dinitrogen tetroxide/nitrogen dioxide (N2O4 and  NO2). It may be used as an oxidizing agent in rocket propulsion systems. A broad range of compositions is available, and can be denoted as MONi, where i represents the percentage of nitric oxide in the mixture (e.g. MON3 contains 3% nitric oxide, MON25 25% nitric oxide). An upper limit is MON40 (40% by weight). In Europe MON 1.3 is mostly used for rocket propulsion systems, while NASA seems to prefer MON 3. A higher percentage of NO decreases the corrosiveness and oxidation potential of the liquid, but increases costs. 

The addition of nitric oxide also reduces the freezing point to a more desirable temperature.

References

Chemical mixtures
Nitrogen compounds
Nitrogen oxides
Rocket oxidizers